The 1993 Sudirman Cup was the third tournament of the World Mixed Team Badminton Championships. It was held from May 24 to May 30, 1993 at the National Indoor Arena in Birmingham, England.

Results
Nigeria and Spain entered but did not participate.

Group 1

Subgroup A

Subgroup B

Relegation playoff

Semi-finals

Final

Group 2

Group 3

Group 4

Group 5

Group 6

Group 7

Group 8

Group 9

Final classification

References

Sudirman Cup
Sudirman Cup
Sudirman Cup